The pyre of Heracles are the ruins of a Doric temple from the 3rd century BCE on Mount Oeta, on the site where the ancient Greek mythological hero Heracles self-immolated. 

They are located in what is now the regional unit of Phocis, Greece. Manius Acilius Glabrio visited them in 191 BCE. The area of the pyre was originally excavated in 1920–1921 with additional excavations resuming in 1988. The nearby village of Pyra has been named after it.

References

Greek mythology
Ancient Greek archaeological sites in Central Greece
Phocis
Mount Oeta
Temples of Heracles
Temples in Greece